Serhiy Mykhaylovych Zadorozhnyi (born 20 February 1976) is a Ukrainian football manager and former player.

References

External links 
 
 

1976 births
Living people
People from Novoazovsk
Ukrainian footballers
Association football defenders
Ukraine international footballers
FC Prometei Dniprodzerzhynsk players
FC Dnipro players
FC Metalurh Novomoskovsk players
FC Hirnyk-Sport Horishni Plavni players
FC Kremin Kremenchuk players
FC Torpedo Zaporizhzhia players
FC Dnipro-2 Dnipropetrovsk players
FC Dnipro-3 Dnipropetrovsk players
FC Kryvbas Kryvyi Rih players
FC Zorya Luhansk players
FC Hoverla Uzhhorod players
FC Nyva Ternopil players
FC Oleksandriya players
Ukrainian Premier League players
Ukrainian First League players
Ukrainian Second League players
Ukrainian football managers
FC Stal Kamianske managers
FC Nyva Ternopil managers
Ukrainian First League managers
Ukrainian Second League managers
Sportspeople from Donetsk Oblast